The 2014 Norwegian Football Cup is the 109th season of the Norwegian annual knockout football tournament. It began with qualification matches in March 2014. The first round was played 24 and 25 April 2014 and the tournament ended with the final on 23 November 2014.

Molde won the title after defeating Odd 2–0 in the final. The achievement made Molde the first club to win back-to-back Norwegian Cup titles since Lillestrøm defended their title in 1978. The victory would have earned Molde a place in the second qualifying round of the 2015–16 UEFA Europa League, but since the club already had qualified to the 2015–16 UEFA Champions League as winners of the 2014 Tippeligaen, this berth was passed down to Strømsgodset, fourth-place fininshers in the league.

Calendar
Below are the dates for each round as given by the official schedule:

Qualifying rounds

First round
The 47 winners from the Second Qualifying Round joined with 81 clubs from the Tippeligaen, 1. divisjon and 2. divisjon in this round of the competition.

|colspan="3" style="background-color:#97DEFF"|24 April 2014

|-
|colspan="3" style="background-color:#97DEFF"|25 April 2014

|}

Second round
The 64 winners from the First Round took part in this stage of the competition. These matches took place on 7 and 8 May 2014.

|colspan="3" style="background-color:#97DEFF"|7 May 2014

|-
|colspan="3" style="background-color:#97DEFF"|8 May 2014

|}

Third round
The 32 winners from the Second Round took part in this stage of the competition. These matches took place on 28 May, 4 and 5 June 2014.

|colspan="3" style="background-color:#97DEFF"|28 May 2014

|-
|colspan="3" style="background-color:#97DEFF"|4 June 2014

|-
|colspan="3" style="background-color:#97DEFF"|5 June 2014

|}

Fourth round
The 16 winners from the Third Round took part in this stage of the competition.

Quarter-finals 
The 8 winners from the Fourth Round took part in this stage of the competition.

Semi-finals 
The 4 winners from the Quarterfinals took part in this stage of the competition.

Final 

The 2 winners from the Semifinals take part in this stage of the competition.

References

 
Norwegian Football Cup seasons
Cup
Norway